Denise Dorrance is an American-born cartoonist and illustrator who publishes under the name Dorrance.

Born in Cedar Rapids, Iowa, she moved to New York in her early twenties where she worked in the fashion department of Cosmopolitan magazine, later moved into photography, and eventually ran Magnum Photos corporate photography division. In 1992 she moved to London and, in spite of herself, began a successful career as a cartoonist and book illustrator.

In 2013 a collection of her cartoons was published by Idlewild, titled "It's All About Mimi". Mimi's is the story of a woman trying to balance life as a fashionista and a mother - and considering Mimi's desire for minimalism and all things chic, it doesn't come naturally!

Her sharply ironic work appears regularly in magazines and newspapers such as The Spectator, Red, The Sunday Times and others. 'Mimi by Dorrance' ran as a weekly humorous cartoon for The Mail on Sunday's "You" magazine, and she illustrated a weekly syndicated column for News Life Media in Australia.

A range of Dorrance greeting cards is published worldwide by UK Greetings and Mint publishing.

Dorrance is married to documentary filmmaker Paul Yule, with whom she has a son.

Books
Fifty is not a Four-Letter Word (2007) by Linda Kelsey - Illustrator
A Red Dress, and Other Poems (2008) by Liz Cowley - Illustrator
Single Mother on the Verge (2009) by Maria Roberts - Illustrator
The Virginia Monologues (2009) by Virginia Ironside - Illustrator
Talking about Jane Austen in Baghdad (2010) by Bee Rowlatt & May Witwit  - Illustrator
The Summer Season (2011) by Julia Williams - Illustrator
Women of a Dangerous Age (2012) by Fanny Blake - Illustrator
Civil Society at the Crossroads (2012) NGO comic strip with N.D. Mazin - Illustrator
"It's All About Mimi" (2013) by Dorrance

External links
Dorrance's website
It's All About Mimi

Living people
British cartoonists
Year of birth missing (living people)